Fabrizio Cristiano De André (18 February 1940 – 11 January 1999) was an Italian singer-songwriter, the most prominent cantautore of his time. His 40-year career reflects his interests in concept albums, literature, poetry, political protest, and French music. He is considered a preminent member of the so-called Genoese School. Because of the great success of his music in Italy and its impact in the Italian collective memory, a number of public places as roads, squares, schools in Italy are entitled to Fabrizio De André.

Biography 

Fabrizio De André was born in Genoa (Pegli), Italy, from an upper-class family.
having a warm deep voice, he started playing guitar at the age of 14. His father gave him some Georges Brassens records, whose songs became the model for the style of his first songs. Moreover, Brassens gave him also the first seeds of the libertarian and pacifist ideas  which will persist in all his future works, also later with more sophisticated productions.

1960s
When he was still a student in February 1961, De André debuted singing a couple of songs in a theater in Genoa. Later the two songs were recorded in his first single released in 1961: "Nuvole barocche"/"E fu la notte", which was in imitation of Domenico Modugno. However, already in the next following recordings of the early 1960s, De André found a more personal style, mixing literature and traditional songs (in particular Medieval ones), presenting himself as a sort of contemporary troubador and narrator of stories. His narrative is centered on the stories of marginalized people and often of antiheroes. Then, he came out with protest songs as La ballata del Miché, the first he authored (together with his friend Clelia Petracchi), La Guerra di Piero (an anti-war song, with the contribution of Vittorio Centenaro) and others. Some of the songs are inspired to his city, Genoa, as in the case of La Città Vecchia (coauthored with Elvio Monti) and Via del Campo (with the music of Enzo Jannacci). He has also written a couple of songs with his close long-life friend Paolo Villaggio, Il Fannullone and Carlo Martello (ritorna dalla battaglia di Poitiers), in 1963.

In 1962 his first son was born, Cristiano De André, from his first wife Enrica "Puny" Rignon, married in the same year.

His first song to reach commercial success was La canzone di Marinella (The song of Marinella) in 1967, thanks to the TV performance of Mina. Many years later, in 1984, Marinella was sung by Joan Baez during an Italian TV program. Following this first success, it was released in 1967 his first long-playing album of new songs, simply named Volume 1. The album opens with a song, Preghiera in Gennaio, dedicated to a friend of his, the singer Luigi Tenco, who had committed suicide before the release of the album during his participation in the Sanremo Festival. Despite the popularity of this festival especially in those years, De André has always refused to participate in any song competition by principle; TV appearances of him remained also very rare. In 1966 the first compilation of De André was released with the name of Tutto Fabrizio De André.

In 1968 he released Tutti morimmo a stento, a concept album among the first sung in Italian, with the arrangement of Gian Piero Reverberi which involved also a large orchestra for the first time in an album of De André. The lyrics of the first song, Il Cantico dei Drogati, was written together with the poet Riccardo Mannerini, one of the most significant persons in the life of De André. De André and Mannerini authored also the lyrics for the 1968-album of the band New Trolls, Senza orario Senza bandiera. In 1969 he released the album Volume 3. Because of some contents of his songs, some of them were censored by the national Italian television channel; however, the same songs were broadcast by the Vatican Radio.

1970s

In 1970 was released the song Il pescatore ("The fisherman"). A second concept album was released in 1970, named La buona novella, inspired by the life of Jesus Christ as reported mainly by the Apocryphal gospels. It followed Non al denaro non all'amore né al cielo in 1971, inspired by the Spoon River Anthology, a collection of short poems from Edgar Lee Masters, with the collaboration of Nicola Piovani for the music and Giuseppe Bentivoglio for the lyrics. In 1973 the concept album of Storia di un impiegato was written on an original subject of De André about the protests of those years, also involving Piovani and Bentivoglio. In 1974 it was released the album Canzoni, including re-recording of many old songs and new translations of songs of Brassens, but also for the first time Leonard Cohen (Suzanne and Joan of Arc) and Bob Dylan (Desolation Row, thanks to the collaboration of Francesco De Gregori). In 1975 the album Volume/8 results from the collaboration with the songwriter Francesco De Gregori and is somehow experimental, in particular in the song lyrics. This album includes also a translation of a song of Leonard Cohen (Seems so long ago, Nancy).

In 1975, De André performed in a concert for the first time, at "La Bussola" in Viareggio. Before that event De André has always refused to perform live concerts because he used to consider himself more a writer of songs than a performer. In the same period, he left Genoa and moved to Sardinia. In 1978 his new concept album was released Rimini, in collaboration with the singer-songwriter Massimo Bubola; the album includes also a translation of Romance in Durango (Avventura a Durango) of Bob Dylan. For the first time, he eventually wrote a song in Gallurese, a local variant of Sardinian language, Zirichiltaggia (litterarly, "Lizard Den"), inspired by the Ballu tundu, beginning to show his passion about minority languages and music traditions from minority groups, also the ones present in Italy.

In 1977 was born his daughter Luvi, from his partner Dori Ghezzi. In 1979 De André and Dori Ghezzi have been kidnapped in Sardinia for four months. Later the same year, De André made a successful tour with the Italian progressive rock band Premiata Forneria Marconi (PFM), from which were released two live albums (In Concerto - Arrangiamenti PFM, voll. 1 and 2). Together with Sergio Bardotti he translated the song Famous Blue Raincoat with the title La Famosa Volpe Azzurra and performed by Ornella Vanoni in her album Ricetta di donna (1980).

1980s

In 1981, De André and Bubola released the single Una storia sbagliata, dedicated to Pier Paolo Pasolini and used as opening in an Italian TV program. Later in 1981 De André released an album without title, also known as L'Indiano (The Indian) due the cover reproducing the painting The Outlier from Frederic Remington. The album is musically more inspired by the rock music than all the previous ones, also because of the collaboration with Bubola for the songwriting. The arrangements were made by the U.S.-American born musician Mark Harris, who in the album also sings the Ave Maria in Sardinian. One song of the album, Hotel Supramonte was inspired by the experience of De André's kidnapping. During 1982, De André, who disliked to travel, was on tour for the first (and for the only) time abroad, in European countries as Austria, Germany and Switzerland.

In 1984 it was released Crêuza de mä, in collaboration with the polystrumentist Mauro Pagani, a former component of PFM. 
This album is very unusual, with music inspired by the mediterranean music involving a rich set of instruments from different traditions of that area, resulting in an original contaminated kind of World music, and entirely sung in Genoese. David Byrne, talking to Rolling Stone, named the album as one of the most important releases of the decade.

In 1985 De André promised to his dying father to stop of his abuse of alcohol. Anyway, he continued to be a heavy smoker.
In 1989 De André married Dori Ghezzi. Their marriage testimony was the actor and long-life friend Beppe Grillo. In the same year, died his brother Mauro, who used to work as a corporate lawyer and who helped also Fabrizio in pursuing his career.

1990s
In 1990 De André released Le nuvole, with the collaboration of Pagani for the music compositions. The album is arranged by Piero Milesi. The first half of album (side A) is sung in Italian, when the second half (side B) is sung in different languages from Italy (Sardinian, Genoese, Neapolitan). The album credited also Francesco Baccini for some verses of the song Ottocento; later Baccini recorded a duo with De André named Genova Blues. In 1991 made a tour, from which was released the double live album 1991 Concerti.

De André collaborated also with the band Tazenda, singing a song in Sardinian (Etta Abba Chelu) and coauthored the song Pitzinnos in sa gherra, both included in their album Limba released in 1992. He sang in Old Occitan with the band Troubaires de Coumboscuro (Mis Amour) in 1995. In 1994 he performed the song Cielito Lindo singing in Spanish as opening in an Italian TV show with this same name.

In 1996 he released his last album, Anime Salve in collaboration with Ivano Fossati. The arrangements are by Milesi. Fossati also duets with De André in two of the songs, the tile-track and Â cùmba. This album is a concept album about the topic of solitude. The first song of the album, Prinçesa, is inspired by the autobiography of the transsexual Fernanda Farias De Albuquerque. This song was awarded of the Targa Tenco as "song of the year". The last song of the album, Smisurata preghiera summarizes the work of the writer Álvaro Mutis; De André released also a version in Portuguese of the song (Desmedida plegaria) included in the score of the film Ilona Arrives with the Rain. The song was awarded the Lunezia Prize.

In 1996 De André also wrote his only novel, Un destino ridicolo together with the writer Alessandro Gennari. Later, in 2008, this novel provides the inspiration for the film Amore che vieni, amore che vai. In 1997 he recorded a new version of Marinella, this time in duo with Mina, included in the compilation Mi innamoravo di tutto. During the two years 1997–1998, De André made the longest tour of his entire career, playing in arenas, open spaces and theaters. Some of the summer dates were opened by the poet and songwriter Oliviero Malaspina, with whom was planning a collaboration also for the next studio album. However, this long tour had to be interrupted because of the first sings of health problems. Then, he was diagnosed a lung cancer.

Fabrizio De André died in Milan on the 11 of January 1999. Two days later, the public funerals took place in the basilique of Santa Maria Assunta in Carignano (Genoa) in front of a large audience of participants. De André was then buried in the family chapel in the Monumental Cemetery of Staglieno.

Discography

Albums
 Volume 1 (1967)
 Tutti morimmo a stento (1968)
 Volume 3 (1968)
 La buona novella (1970)
 Non al denaro non all'amore né al cielo (1971)
 Storia di un impiegato (1973)
 Canzoni (1974)
 Volume 8 (1975)
 Rimini (1978)
 Fabrizio De André (1981)
 Crêuza de mä (1984)
 Le nuvole (1990)
 Anime salve (1996)

Compilations
 Tutto Fabrizio De André (1966)
 La canzone di Marinella (1968)
 Nuvole barocche (1968)
 Fabrizio De André (also known as the Black Anthology) (1976)
 Fabrizio De André (also known as the Blue Anthology) (1986)
 Il viaggio (1991)
 La canzone di Marinella (1995, reissue)
 Mi innamoravo di tutto (1997)
 Da Genova (1999)
 Peccati di gioventù (2000)
 In direzione ostinata e contraria (2005)
 In direzione ostinata e contraria 2 (2006)
 Effedia: Sulla mia cattiva strada (2008)

Live albums
 Fabrizio De André in Concerto (1979)
 Fabrizio De André in Concerto vol. 2 (1980)
 1991 concerti (1991)
 In concerto (1999) (A selection of songs from De André's last-ever filmed concerts, released in their entirety on the same-titled 2004 DVD)
 Ed avevamo gli occhi troppo belli (2001)
 In concerto volume II (2001) (The remaining songs from the 1998 In Concerto final shows) 
 Fabrizio De André & PFM in concerto (2007) (Newly mixed and "de-mastered" reissue of the PFM-led live albums from 1979 and 1980)

Tributes 
 Faber, amico fragile (2003) (2 CDs)
 PFM canta De André (2008) (CD + DVD)
 Faber nostrum (2019)

Singles
 "Nuvole barocche"/"E fu la notte" (1960)
 "La ballata del Michè"/"La ballata dell'eroe" (1961)
 "Il fannullone"/"Carlo Martello ritorna dalla battaglia di Poitiers" (1963)
 "Il testamento"/"La ballata del Michè" (1963)
 "La guerra di Piero"/"La ballata dell'eroe" (1964)
 "Valzer per un amore"/"La canzone di Marinella" (1964)
 "Per i tuoi larghi occhi"/"Fila la lana" (1965)
 "La città vecchia"/"Delitto di paese" (1965)
 "La canzone dell'amore perduto"/"La ballata dell'amore cieco (o della vanità)" (1966)
 "Geordie"/"Amore che vieni, amore che vai" (1966)
 "Preghiera in Gennaio"/"Si chiamava Gesù" (1967)
 "Via del Campo"/"Bocca di rosa" (1967)
 "Caro amore"/"Spiritual" (1967)
 "La canzone di Barbara"/"Carlo Martello ritorna dalla battaglia di Poitiers" (1968)
 "La canzone di Marinella"/"Amore che vieni, amore che vai" (1968)
 "Il gorilla"/"Nell'acqua della chiara fontana" (1969)
 "Leggenda di Natale"/"Inverno" (1969)
 "Il pescatore"/"Marcia nuziale" (1970)
 "La stagione del tuo amore"/"Spiritual" (1970)
 "Nuvole barocche"/"E fu la notte" (1971, reissue)
 "Un matto (Dietro ogni scemo c'è un villaggio)"/"Un giudice" (1971)
 "Suzanne"/"Giovanna d'Arco" (1972)
 "La cattiva strada"/"Amico fragile" (1974)
 "Il pescatore"/"Carlo Martello ritorna dalla battaglia di Poitiers" (1978)
 "Una storia sbagliata"/"Titti" (1980)

Box-sets
 I concerti (16 CDs) (2012)

Videography

Music videos 
 La domenica delle salme (1990) - Directed by Gabriele Salvatores
 Mégu megún (1990) - Directed by Gabriele Salvatores, starring: Claudio Bisio
 Ho visto Nina volare (1997) - Directed by Pietro Follini

Concerts 
 Fabrizio De André in Concerto (2004)
 Fabrizio De André e PFM - Il concerto ritrovato (2020)

Documentaries 
 Effedia: Sulla mia cattiva strada (2008)
 Dentro Faber (2011) - (8 DVDs on different subjects each)

Tributes 
 Omaggio a Fabrizio De André (2006) (Tribute concert performed in the Roman Amphitheatre of Cagliari on the 10th of July, 2005)
 PFM canta De André (2008)

Inspired movies 
 Amore che vieni, amore che vai (2008) - Directed by Daniele Costantini
 Fabrizio De André - Principe libero (2018) - Directed by Luca Facchini

Novels

Notes and references

Further reading

External links

 
 

 
1940 births
1999 deaths
Musicians from Genoa
People of Piedmontese descent
Anarcho-pacifists
Italian anarchists
Italian libertarians
Italian pacifists
Left-libertarians
Deaths from cancer in Lombardy
Kidnapped Italian people
20th-century Italian male singers
Critics of the Catholic Church